Kārewa / Gannet Island is a small island some  offshore from Kawhia on the west coast of New Zealand's North Island.

Description
The island consists of the eroded remnant of a tuff ring, erupted about half a million years ago. It is considerably younger than, and compositionally distinct from, the nearby onshore Alexandra Volcanics (Mount Karioi and Mount Pirongia) and Okete Volcanics. In heavy swells the island can be washed over, so that only about  has vegetation and that limited to Prasiola (algae), Tortula (moss) and Xanthoria, and Xanthoparmelia lichens.

Gannets
Protected as a wildlife sanctuary, it was found to be the country's largest single breeding colony of Australasian gannets in a 1980 census. Holding about 8000 breeding pairs, the island has been identified as an Important Bird Area, by BirdLife International.

See also

 List of islands
 List of islands of New Zealand
 List of volcanoes in New Zealand
 Desert island

External links 

 2012 photo on the island

References

Islands of Waikato
Uninhabited islands of New Zealand
Volcanic islands of New Zealand
Volcanoes of Waikato
Pleistocene volcanoes
Pleistocene Oceania
Important Bird Areas of New Zealand